The following is a list of non-Gaelic games played at Croke Park (formerly Jones's Road). The Gaelic Athletic Association formerly prohibited the playing of foreign sports at GAA-owned stadiums under Rule 42 of its rule book.

While this wording remains as the current Rule 5.1(b), a footnote now reads:

In practice the rule was only applied to the sports of soccer and rugby, which were perceived to be rivals to the playing of Gaelic games. Cricket was also banned, but Croke Park is too small for a cricket field. As such, several games of American football have been played with rule 42 in force, as well as a boxing match and a baseball game. The rule was officially relaxed in 2005 for the duration of the reconstruction of Lansdowne Road, to allow for the playing of Republic of Ireland soccer and Irish rugby internationals. The Republic of Ireland soccer and Ireland rugby internationals moved into the new Aviva Stadium on the former Lansdowne Road site upon its opening in May 2010; the last international in either sport at Croke Park was the rugby team's 2010 Six Nations home fixture with Scotland on 20 March.

On 17 June 2010 the Australia national cricket team had a training session in Croke Park ahead of their One Day International against Ireland.

American football

Association football (soccer) 

Updated 2 June 2021

Baseball

Boxing

Olympics

Rugby union 

Updated 26 May 2021

References

Croke Park
Non-Gaelic games
Croke Park
Croke Park
C